Prantij is a town and a municipality in Sabarkantha district in the Indian state of Gujarat.

Geography
Average height from sea level is 98 Meters (328 feet).

Demographics
 India census, Prantij had a population of 22,306. Males constitute 52% of the population and females 48%. Prantij has an average literacy rate of 70%, higher than the national average of 59.5%: male literacy is 77%, and female literacy is 62%. In Prantij, 12% of the population is under 6 years of age.

Transport
Prantij railway station is the main railway station of the town situated on Ahmedabad–Udaipur Line under the Ahmedabad railway division of Western Railway zone.

Places of interest
 Tomb of Sikandar Shah, Prantij

Memorial
A memorial plaque is erected in a compound of I P Mission church in Prantij, Gujarat which cites a well in which 300 children who died in famine were buried. The plaque reads, "the children will be never hungry again".

References

Cities and towns in Sabarkantha district